Yabaragawa Dam is a gravity dam located in Shimane Prefecture in Japan. The dam is used for flood control. The catchment area of the dam is 47.6 km2. The dam impounds about 42  ha of land when full and can store 7000 thousand cubic meters of water. The construction of the dam was done during 1994.

References

Dams in Shimane Prefecture
1994 establishments in Japan